Tuili is a comune (municipality) in the Province of South Sardinia in the Italian region Sardinia, located about  north of Cagliari and about  northeast of Sanluri.

Tuili borders the following municipalities: Barumini, Gesturi, Las Plassas, Pauli Arbarei, Setzu, Turri.

References

Cities and towns in Sardinia